Tetrazygia bicolor is a species flowering plant in the glory bush family, Melastomataceae, that is native to southern Florida in the United States and the Caribbean. Common names include Florida clover ash, Florida tetrazygia and West Indian lilac.

Description
The shrub is multi-trunked, the stems' colour can be green or reddish. The plant flowers during the spring and summer. The flowers are white or pinkish and the oval fruit is brown and attracts birds.

The shrub grows in the subtropical wetlands of Everglades. It prefers partial shade and grows in acidic, alkaline, sand, loam and clay soils. It has a high drought tolerance but will also grow on well-drained soils.

References

Tetrazygia bicolor Florida Tetazygia, West Indian Lilac, Edward F. Gilman, Environmental Horticulture Department, Florida Cooperative Extension Service, Institute of Food and Agricultural Sciences, University of Florida. Original publication date October, 1999. Reviewed May, 2007.

External links

bicolor
Flora of the Caribbean
Flora of Florida
Flora without expected TNC conservation status